Cucamonga School District is K-8 a school district in San Bernardino County, California that covers parts of Rancho Cucamonga and Ontario. The district was established in 1870 and currently serves approximately 2900 students. The district feeds into Chaffey Joint Union High School District.

Schools

Elementary schools
 Cucamonga Elementary School
 Los Amigos Elementary School
 The Ontario Center School

Middle school
 Rancho Cucamonga Middle School

References

External links
 District website

School districts in San Bernardino County, California
School districts established in 1870